Oldominion is an American hip hop collective, consisting of more than twenty members. It was described by Casey Jarman of Willamette Week as the "Northwest's largest hip-hop crew" which "united the local underground rap scene for the first time".

History 
After Oraclez Creed (Onry Ozzborn, Pale Soul, and Sleep) connected with Frontline (Destro, Nyqwil, and Snafu), Rochester A.P. named the group Oldominion in 1999. The first album, One, was released in 2000.

Discography
Albums
 One (2000)
 Make Happy (2008)

EPs
 Book of Fury (2000)
 Oldominion Volume 1 (2001)
 Oldominion Volume 2 (2001)
 Oldominion Volume 3 (2002)

Compilations
 Negative One and a Half (2004)

Singles
 "Don't Kill Your Radio" (1999)
 "Parallel to Hell / Serenade to Silence" (2000)
 "Ten" (2008)

See also 
 Pacific Northwest hip hop
 Underground hip hop

References

External links
 

Alternative hip hop groups
American hip hop groups
1999 establishments in the United States
Musical groups established in 1999